François-Nicolas Chifflart (21 March 1825 – 19 March 1901) was a French painter, illustrator and etcher.

Biography 
He was born in Saint-Omer. His father was a locksmith who was also known for his skill as a carver and worked for Louis Fiolet, a notable manufacturer of earthenware tobacco pipes. He introduced his son to printmaking.

François began studying at the municipal school of design at an early age. In 1844, he entered the École des Beaux-arts and became a student of Léon Cogniet. He took third place in the competition for the Prix de Rome in 1850 for his painting Zénobie sur les bords de l'Araxe (Zenobia on the Banks of the Aras) then, the following year, was awarded first place for Périclès au lit de mort de son fils (Pericles at the Deathbed of His Son).

Shortly after, he rebelled against the Academicism of the time, focusing more on designing and engraving. His illustrations for Faust were especially notable and were praised by Baudelaire. Later, he made the acquaintance of Victor Hugo and began a new career as an illustrator in 1867. He helped design illustrations for Hugo's Toilers of the Sea (engraved by Fortuné Méaulle) and a new edition of The Hunchback of Notre Dame.

He lost most of his clientele when he began to harshly criticize Napoleon III during the Franco-Prussian War, and sank into an oblivion from which he never fully recovered. Despite this, a street in Saint-Omer has been named after him. He died in 1901 in Paris.

Selected works

References

Further reading
 Louis Noël, François Chifflart, Peintre et Graveur Français 1825–1901, Sa Vie – Son Œuvre (His life and work) Vandroth-Fauconnier, 1902 (with a catalog raisonné).
 Pierre Georgel, François Nicolas Chifflart 1825–1901 (exhibition catalog) Musée de l'hôtel Sandelin, 1972
 Valérie Sueur (ed.), François Chifflart, graveur et illustrateur (exhibition catalog) Musée d'Orsay, 1993 
 Didier Rykner, Des dessins de Chifflart acquis parle Musée de l'hôtel de Sandelin, in La Tribune de l'Art 25 January 2013. Online.

External links 

 ArtNet: More works by Chifflart
 "François- Nicolas Chifflart, illustrateur de Victor Hugo « un oeil, tout grand ouvert dans les ténèbres »"  (An Eye Wide Open in the Darkness) @ Paris.fr

1825 births
1901 deaths
French illustrators
People from Saint-Omer
French lithographers
Prix de Rome for painting
19th-century French painters
French male painters
19th-century French male artists